Divana is a genus of moths within the family Castniidae. It was erected by Jacqueline Y. Miller in 1982, and contains the single species Divana diva, first described by Arthur Gardiner Butler in 1870. It is known from Nicaragua, Panama, and Colombia.

Subspecies
Divana diva diva (Nicaragua)
Divana diva chiriquiensis (Strand, 1913) (Panama)
Divana diva hoppi (Hering, 1923) (Colombia)
Divana diva tricolor (R. Felder, 1874) (Colombia)

References

Castniidae